Irina Muluile (born 6 March 1989) is a French actress. She has appeared in L'École pour tous, Camping 2, Heal the Living and, since 2015, in the French political thriller television series The Bureau as Daisy Bapes ("The Mule").

Biography 
Irina Muluile was born on 6 March 1989 in Kinshasa, Democratic Republic of Congo.

She arrived in France with her parents at the age of 3 months and grew up in Villemomble.
In 2000, she moved in Sevran in Seine-Saint-Denis. She practises Muay Thai, rugby, dancing and singing.

References

External links

 

1989 births
Living people
French film actresses
French television actresses
21st-century French actresses
People from Kinshasa